The adjective Vascon may refer to:
the Vascones, ancient people of Navarre and neighboring regions
by extension, the cultural features related to the area where the Basque language was supposedly spoken at the arrival of the Romans. This area includes both sides of the Pyrenees from Calahorra to Upper Pallars.
for further extension, see also: Vasconic languages